Birkirkara (abbreviated as B'Kara) is a city in the central region of Malta. It is the second most populous on the island, with 24,356 inhabitants as of 2020. The town consists of five autonomous parishes: Saint Helen, Saint Joseph the Worker, Our Lady of Mount Carmel, Saint Mary and San Gorg Preca. The city's motto is In hoc signo vinces, and its coat of arms is a plain red cross, surmounted by a crown.

Etymology

Birkirkara means "cold water" or "running water". This is attributed to the valley in the town.

Originally, the name was written as Birchircara, as influenced by Italian spelling which traditionally does not use the letter 'K'. It is often abbreviated as B'kara/Kara.

Geography
Birkirkara is situated in a valley, which is most likely where it gets its name from. It is known for flooding on heavy stormy days. Several projects have been proposed. The area has also received embellishment works from time to time.

Climate 
Birkirkara features a Csa Mediterranean climate under the Köppen climate classification. Birkirkara features mild, wet winters and dry hot summers. The city's temperature varies from  during the course of a year.

Description
Birkirkara is one of Malta's oldest towns  with a recorded mention in 1402 with The Cappella of Birkarkam which is understood to be an error for Birkirkara.  It received mention in the 1436 Ecclesiastical Report mentioning the then existing parishes in Malta and Gozo, from which Birkirkara emerged as the largest parish. Various parishes and suburbs developed out of Birkirkara over the years, including Sliema, St. Julian's, Msida, Ħamrun in the 19th century and Santa Venera in the early 20th century. In more recent years, San Ġwann (1965) and Ta' l-Ibraġ hived off Birkirkara to form part of the new parish and locality of Swieqi in 1993.

Birkirkara has grown into an important commercial centre as well as a densely populated residential area.

Churches, architecture and notable places

Notable places 
Birkirkara is home to many locations of importance.

 Malta Financial Services Authority  the financial regulator of Malta has its headquarters in Birkirkara.
 St Aloysius College
 The Wignacourt Aqueduct built in the 17th century.
 St Helen's Basilica, housing Malta's largest church bell.
 Simonds Farsons Cisk  - the first brewery on the Island.
 Dar Pirotta
 Dar Papa Frangisku - A Homeless shelter run by the Maltese branch of Caritas Internationalis
 Villa Chelsea now home to The Richmond Foundation - A Charity offering Rehabilitation Programmes.
 The Old Birkirkara Railway Station which is today located within a public garden is one such place. Malta Railway trains used as means of transportation across the island stopped at this Station. The Railway was closed in 1931.
 Roxy Cinema
 Birkirkara Tower (Ghar il-Gobon)
 Tal-Wejter Tower
 Villa Lauri
 Ta' Ganu Windmill

Churches 
Birkirkara's main religious feast is that of St Helen at St. Helen's Basilica,  which is celebrated on 18 August or on the first Sunday after that date. The main event of the celebration is a procession with a  wooden statue carved by the Maltese master-sculptor Salvu Psaila.  Notably, this is the only procession on the island carried out in the morning. The procession leaves the basilica at exactly 8:00 a.m. and returns to it at 10:45 am. The statue is lifted to shoulder-height by a group of townsmen through the main streets of the town.

 The Church of St. Joseph the Worker
 The Church of St. Mary
 The Church of San Gorg Preca
 The Church of Our Lady of Mount Carmel
 The Church of St Paul B'kara had a previous building on the same site likely to date back to around 1538. Its design was medieval with a slanting roof. The present building known as 'San Pawl tal-Wied' was built in 1852 to 1854 on plans drawn up by Giuseppe Bonavia who was an architect with the Royal Engineers. The clock of the church was made by Michelangelo Sapiano in 1891. The titular painting by Giuseppe Calleja is a reproduction of the original found in the Tre Fontane Church in Rome.

The Church of Our Lady of Victories is a small church found within the small narrow streets in the area known as 'Has-Sajjied'. This church was known to have existed as far back as 1575. In the 17th century when the parish church was being built this church was dismantled to allow easy access to the quarry that was supplying the stones needed. It was erected once again after the 1675–1676 Malta plague epidemic. The present church was built between 1728 and 1736 in the Baroque style. The internal pilasters follow the Tuscan style with the dome featuring floral motifs and emblems of the Litany of the Blessed Virgin Mary.

Monuments 
 Monument of Sir Anthony Mamo
 Niche of All Souls

Birkirkara Local Council

The  Birkirkara Local Council forms part of the Birkirkara Civice Centre building. The current Birkirkara local council members are:

Joanne Debono Grech (Mayor)
Karl Cutajar (Deputy Mayor)
Justin Schembri
Nancy Aquilina
Rita Borg
Kaylocke Buhagiar
Antoine Attard
Owen Patrick Attard
John Mary Calleja 
Deborah Mifsud
John Mizzi 
Marie Claire Zammit Bonello
Francis Pullicino
Carmel Attard (Executive Secretary)

Birkirkara community service

Our Lady of Mount Carmel Parish Church, Triq Fleur-de-Lys (Fleur-de-Lys Road), Fleur-de-Lys
Our Lady, Mother of the Church Parish Church, Triq il-Graffiti Navali, Swatar
St. Joseph the Worker Parish Church, Triq il-Bwieraq (Bwieraq Street)
St. Helen's Parish Church, Triq is-Santwarju (Sanctuary Street)
St. Mary's Parish Church, Triq il-Knisja l-Qadima (Old Church Street)
Our Lady of Victory Parish Church, Triq il-Vitorja (Victory Street)
Birkirkara District Police Station, Triq il-Kbira (Main Street)
Birkirkara Branch Post Office, Triq il-Wied (Valley Road
Da Vinci Hospital, Triq Kan. K. Pirotta (Can. K. Pirotta Street)
Birkirkara Health Centre, Triq Tumas Fenech
Birkirkara Regional Library, Triq Tumas Fenech
Birkirkara Police Station

Zones in Birkirkara

Bwieraq
Fleur-de-Lys
L-Mrieħel
Ta' Ganu
Ta' Paris
Tal-Qattus
Is-Swatar
Ħas-Sajjied

Sport
Birkirkara has a multi-sport club in Birkirkara Saint Joseph Sports Club mostly known for its Athletics section, however, it also has active sections responsible for cycling, triathlon, swimming, and football, which competes in the Maltese Inter-Amateur Soccer Competition.

Birkirkara F.C. has won the Maltese Premier League four times. Birkirkara F.C. participated in the 2015–16 UEFA Europa League beating West Ham United F.C., only to be eliminated via penalties. Birkirkara also eliminated Heart of Midlothian in the 2016–17 UEFA Europa League. Malta's leader of the opposition Adrian Delia served as Birkirkara F.C. president from 2015-2016 and 2017-2018.

Natives 
Iacob Heraclid, the Greco-Maltese adventurer who ruled over Moldavia in the 1560s, was born in the city. Eddie Fenech Adami, who served as Prime Minister and President of Malta, was born there, as was Anthony Mamo, the first President of Malta.

Twin towns – sister cities

Birkirkara is twinned with:
 Grosseto, Italy
 Sorrento, Italy
 Longobardi, Italy
 Carbonne, France

References

External links

Birkirkara Football Club
Birkirkara St. Joseph Sports Club
Birkirkara Local Council

 
Towns in Malta
Local councils of Malta